Associated Banc-Corp is a U.S. regional bank holding company providing retail banking, commercial banking, commercial real estate lending, private banking, and specialized financial services. Headquartered in Green Bay, Wisconsin, Associated is a Midwest bank with from more than 200 banking locations serving more than 100 communities throughout Wisconsin, Illinois and Minnesota. The company also operates loan production offices in Indiana, Michigan, Missouri, New York, Ohio and Texas. 

At July 26, 2022, it had $39 billion in assets and is the largest bank holding company based in Wisconsin. Associated Bank is a nationally chartered bank, regulated by the Office of the Comptroller of the Currency within the Department of the Treasury. Associated Bank is a member of the Federal Deposit Insurance Corporation, the Federal Reserve Bank of Chicago, and the Federal Home Loan Bank of Chicago. The company has approximately 4,200 employees.

History

The Associated Banc-Corp holding company was formed on May 1, 1970, when three community banks formed a banking alliance that consolidated into Associated Bank. The three founding community banks were: The First National Bank of Neenah, founded in 1861; Kellogg Citizens National Bank, Green Bay, founded 1874; and Manitowoc Savings Bank, founded in 1884.

 1989 – Acquired the Associated De Pere Bank of De Pere, Wisconsin
 1991 – Acquired Farmers State Bank of Pound, Wisconsin, and F&M Financial Services
 1992 – Acquired Wausau Financial and Northeast Wisconsin Financial Services
 1993 – Changed name to Associated Bank, NA of Green Bay, Wisconsin
 1993 – Acquired First National Bank of Sturgeon Bay of Sturgeon Bay, Wisconsin
 1995 – Acquired GN Bancorp of Illinois
 1996 – Acquired Mid-American National Bancorp of Illinois
 1997 – Acquired Centra Financial of Wisconsin
 1997 – Merged with First Financial Corporation of Stevens Point, Wisconsin
 1998 – Acquired Citizens Bank, NA of Shawano, Wisconsin
 1999 – Acquired Windsor Bancshares of Minnesota
 2001 – Changed name to Associated Bank, NA; merged and re-branded existing affiliate banks in Milwaukee, Wisconsin; Neenah, Wisconsin; Manitowoc, Wisconsin; Wausau, Wisconsin; and Madison, Wisconsin
 2002 – Acquired Signal Financial Corp. of Minnesota
 2003 – Merged and re-branded affiliates: Associated Card Services Bank in Stevens Point, Wisconsin, and Associated Bank Illinois in Rockford, Illinois
 2004 – Acquired First Federal Capital Bank of La Crosse, Wisconsin, expanding into Western and Southwest Wisconsin
 2005 – Merged and re-branded affiliate banks in Minneapolis, Minnesota, and in Chicago, Illinois
 2005 – Acquired State Financial Services of Hales Corners, Wisconsin, and expanded to Northern Illinois
 2007 – Acquired First National Bank of Hudson, Wisconsin 
 2008 – Received $525 Million share of the $700 Billion Troubled Asset Relief Program (TARP) fund
 2009 – Appointed William R. Hutchinson as Chairman of the Board of Directors and Philip B. Flynn as President and CEO
 2010 – Issued $435 million of common stock in an offering to support continued growth
 2011 – Repaid $525 Million share of the $700 Billion Troubled Asset Relief Program (TARP) fund 
 2012 – Redeveloped the Downtown Green Bay Regency building, to create the new Associated Center as its headquarters
 2013 – Named one of the 100 Most Trustworthy Companies by Forbes
 2014 – Joined the New York Stock Exchange and began trading under the ticker "ASB"
 2015 – Acquired Ahmann & Martin Co., a risk and employee benefits consulting firm
 2016 – Purchased the 28-story Milwaukee Center office building to allow for future expansion of the company
 2017 – Acquired Whitnell & Co., a wealth management family services firm
 2018 – Acquired Bank Mutual of Milwaukee, Wisconsin
2018 – Acquired Diversified Insurance Solutions, a Milwaukee based employee benefits insurance agency
2018 – Acquired Anderson Insurance & Investment Agency, a Minneapolis based workers compensation insurance agency
2019 – Acquired 32 Wisconsin branches from The Huntington National Bank
2020 – Acquired the First National Bank of Staunton, Illinois
2020 – Appointed John (Jay) B. Williams as Chairman of the Board of Directors
2020 – Sold Associated Benefits & Risk Consulting (ABRC) to USI Insurance Services LLC (USI) for $266 million
2021 – Appointed Andy Harmening as President and CEO
2022 – Consolidated 13 branches in Wisconsin and Illinois; announced first "micro branch" following new micro office model

Subsidiaries
During the 1990s and 2000s, Associated Banc-Corp merged all of its affiliated banks into Associated Bank, N.A., a wholly owned subsidiary.

Subsidiaries of Associated Bank, N.A. include: Associated Trust Company, N.A.; Associated Investment Corp; and Associated Community Development, LLC.

Sports sponsorships 
Associated Bank has been the bank of the Green Bay Packers since 1919. It is a banking partner of the Milwaukee Brewers, the University of Wisconsin-Madison Athletics, and the Minnesota Wild. It is also the bank of the Wisconsin Athletic Hall of Fame.

References

Bibliography

External links
 

 Associated Benefits and Risk Consulting 

Companies based in Green Bay, Wisconsin
Companies listed on the New York Stock Exchange
Banks based in Wisconsin
American companies established in 1861
Banks established in 1861
1861 establishments in Wisconsin